ŠK Eldus Močenok was a Slovak football team, based in the town of Močenok.

In 2007, the club was dissolved due to financial problems.

References

External links
Official website 

Eldus Mocenok
Eldus Mocenok
Eldus Mocenok
2000 establishments in Slovakia
2007 disestablishments in Slovakia